Battle of Galashki (2002) was a confortation between Russian federal forces and Ruslan Gelayev's forces in Galashki.

Battle 
In September 23, 2002, around 300 Chechen rebels under command of Ruslan Gelayev trespassed through Ingushetia from the territory of Georgia with the aim of further passage to Chechnya. One of the militant units under the command of Abdul-Malik Mezhidov entered into battle with Russian troops near the Ingush village of Galashki. The militants shot down one Mi-24 helicopter from the Igla MANPADS, knocking out two from grenade launchers armored personnel carrier and killing 12 soldiers and officers of the federal troops. Russian troops actively used artillery, aviation, armored vehicles. 76 militants were destroyed, several were taken prisoner. The militants, breaking up into mobile detachments, fled to the territory of Chechnya.

References 

Conflicts in 2002
Battles involving Chechnya
Battles involving Ingushetia